Doctor Who: Evacuation Earth is a video game for the Nintendo DS based on the BBC TV series Doctor Who, developed by British studio Asylum Entertainment.

The game is written by Doctor Who writer Oli Smith and features Matt Smith and Karen Gillan providing voices for their characters.

It is the second Doctor Who video game to be released for the DS after the port of Top Trumps: Doctor Who.

Plot
The story features both the Daleks and Silurians. The Doctor has to help humans as they attempt to evacuate the Earth, while the Daleks intervene and attempt to force the Doctor to help them instead.

Development
On 12 March 2010, it was first reported that Nintendo had signed a £10 million contract with the BBC to bring Doctor Who to the Wii and DS consoles.

On 24 August 2010, it was revealed the game would be titled Doctor Who: Evacuation Earth and would be released with a Wii counterpart titled Doctor Who: Return to Earth. In a press release managing director Simon Bailey of Asylum Entertainment said "We are incredibly excited to be collaborating with BBC Worldwide on these two new games," further saying "It is our firm belief that the franchise has massive potential on the Nintendo DS and Wii formats and it's an honour to be bringing 'Doctor Who' video games to the show's huge fan base".

Reception

Video game talk show Good Game'''s two presenters gave the game a 3/10 and 2/10 saying "...it makes the fatal mistake of ignoring pretty much everything that makes Doctor Who great." Also claiming that the developers just grabbed a puzzle game off the shelf, but not a very good one, scribbled out the title and stuck a Doctor Who sticker in its place.

The Official Nintendo Magazine rated it as 69%, saying that "It's funny, it's lengthy and it'll test their logic skills at the same time. But any Doctor Who fans of secondary school age or older are more likely to feel left out, because this clearly wasn't meant for you."

See alsoDoctor Who: Return to Earth - another video game released alongside Evacuation Earth''

References

External links

Interview about the games on the Official Nintendo Magazine UK website
Doctor Who: Evacuation Earth on GameSpot
Announcement at the Doctor Who News page

2010 video games
Adventure games
Asylum Entertainment games
Dalek stories
Eleventh Doctor stories
Nintendo DS games
Nintendo DS-only games
Puzzle video games
Science fiction video games
Single-player video games
Evacuation Earth
Video games developed in the United Kingdom